Gianfranco is a compound Italian given name, consisting of Gian- and Franco. Gian- comes from Giovanni and is used in compound names. It is closest to John or French Jean. Gianni means "God is gracious" and Franco means "Free man" or "Frenchman", a contracted form of Francesco.

It may refer to:
Gianfranco Brancatelli- Italian racing driver
Gianfranco Dettori- Italian jockey, father of Frankie Dettori
Gianfranco Ferré- Italian fashion designer
Gianfranco Fini- Italian politician
Gianfranco Lotti- Italian fashion designer
Gianfranco Parolini- Italian film director
Gianfranco Rotondi- Italian politician
Gianfranco Seramondi, Swiss footballer
Gianfranco Zola- Italian footballer

See also
John (first name)
Francis (given name)
Franco (disambiguation)
Giovanni (name)

Italian masculine given names